The North Central Connecticut Conference is a high school league, and is a part of the Connecticut Interscholastic Athletic Conference.

History
In July 1999 Enfield High school a founding member of the CCC Conference in 1984, applied to join the NCCC conference. In 2016 Enfield would leave the NCCC conference and rejoin the CCC Conference as a result of its merger with Enrico Fermi High School. Also in 1999 E.O. Smith High school would join the CCC due to increasing enrollment. In 2015 ECC schools, Griswold, Plainfield, Killingly, Windham, Woodstock Academy, Lyman Memorial in Lebanon and Tourtellotte applied to join the NCCC conference.

Member schools

Former members

References

External links
 

Education in Connecticut
High school sports conferences and leagues in the United States
Sports in Connecticut
Education in Hartford County, Connecticut
Education in Tolland County, Connecticut